Kenny Doughty is an English actor and director, best known for playing DS Aiden Healy on ITV's Crime Drama Vera.

Early life
Doughty was born in Barnsley, South Yorkshire. He attended Charter School, which became the Kingstone School on Broadway Barnsley, where he performed a leading role in Grease. He trained at the Guildhall School of Music and Drama.

Career 
Doughty plays DS Aiden Healy opposite Brenda Blethyn in ITV's Vera.

Doughty completed a UK tour of Simon Beaufoy's stage play The Full Monty in 2013. The play, in which Doughty played Gaz, was nominated for a Laurence Olivier Award for Best New Comedy in 2014.
He also was in Stella as Sean McGaskill.

Filmography

As actor

As director

References

External links 
 
 

Living people
Actors from Barnsley
Male actors from Yorkshire
Alumni of the Guildhall School of Music and Drama
English male film actors
English male television actors
1975 births
Date of birth missing (living people)